Bayan Ul Quran (Urdu: بیان القرآن) is a three volume tafsir (exegesis) of the Quran written by Indian Islamic scholar, Ashraf Ali Thanwi (d.1943). Originally written in Urdu, it is the most prominent work of its author. The tafsīr is said to be specifically for scholars.

Background 
The compilation of this exegesis was started in 1320 AH. Thanwi completed this in 1905 (1323 AH). It was published in twelve volumes from Matb'a Mujtabai, Delhi in 1908 (1326 AH). The prominent Khutba-i-Tafsir-i-Bayan al Quran by the author occupies a very pivotal place in all editions, because in this ‘Khutba’ Thanwi has discussed the causes for compiling this Tafsir. He Says: "I used to ponder about the compilation of a precise exegesis of Quran which can touch the important aspects and dimensions of society without any innovation, but I was aware about the inferable exegesis of Quran compiled before and this is why I counted any other exegesis of Quran an addition to the number not something cut of box. This was the time when people used to translate the Quran for market gains which was contradicting the rulings of Sharia, and common Muslims went astray due to its misinterpretations. However these misinterpretations of Quran were countered by many pamphlets but were inadequate to counter this tide…..In this background on 12th Rabi al-Awal 1320 A.H I began to compile this Tafsir with the hope of after worldly gains from Allah, and it may prove beneficial for the masses."

Methodology 
The seven most important characteristic feature of this Tafsir according to Thanwi are:
 Use of simple words in translating the Quranic verses to make it easy to be comprehended.
 No use of phrases in translation, because phrases have many connotations. The translation has to be in prose so that it maintains clarity of the text and lucidity.
 Efforts have been made to prevent the readers from doubts and misconceptions. The most difficult topics are supported with explanatory notes.
 If a verse has diverse narrations for its exegesis, the most authentic narration has been taken into consideration.
 The commentary of verses is made to display in itself a sound connection.
 Out of four schools of Jurisprudence, Hanafi school of thought is taken into consideration, and if needed other schools are textualised on the margins.
 For specific purpose Arabic margin is added, in which Makki and Madani, obscure words are explained, context and background of verses is also given. The Arabic margin is basically Arabic exegesis of Quran which is very beneficial for students and scholars.

Thanwi was the staunch follower of Hanafi school of thought, which reflects quite clearly in his Tafsir. According to Rihana Sidiqi: "Maulana Thanwi was a conformer of Hanafi school of thought. He considers the conformation of school of thought obligatory, hence we find him critical to those people who try to unjustify the conformation by misinterpreting the Quranic verses."

Though, Thanwi was a hanafi jurisprudence scholar, he had spiritual inclination as well. This is why while deducing the legal injunctions from the Quranic verses; he had also deduced mystical dimensions from Quran. This is the first Urdu exegesis of Quran in which mystical dimensions have been extracted from Quranic verses. The main purpose behind the deduction was to clear the confusion regarding Tasawwuf.

According to Thanwi in this exegesis of Quran following twenty necessary measures have been taken into consideration.
 While compiling this exegesis, Tafsir al-Baydawi, Tafsir al-Jalalayn, Tafsir-i-Rehmani, Al-itqan, Tafsir-i-Malim Al-Tanzil, Tafsir al-Alusi, Tafsir-i-Madarik, Tafsir-i-Khazin, Tafsir-i-Ibn-e-Kathir, Al-Dur al-Manthur and Al-Kashshaaf etc. have been consulted. Besides these Tafasir some books of Jurisprudence and Hadith were also consulted.
 The connection between the chapters and verses; and the abstract of chapters is also recorded.
 The citation of the verses is provided in order to avoid the repetition of exegesis of verses.
 The narrations about Tafsir have been scrutinized and analyzed before considering them as substantial base for the exegesis.
 While clarifying doubts, the intention was to clarify those doubts which produced sound arguments.
 Superfluous contents are not used in this exegesis.
 Phrases have been avoided in order to develop a comprehensive exegesis.
 All the information about the old scriptures has been taken from Tafsir-i-Haqani.
 At some places the exegesis should have been further explored. It is better to prefer other authentic exegesis in this regard.
 Those Fiqh issues are discussed which fall within the paradigm.
 The citation of contents is provided that makes the Tafsir easy for the readers.
 Predecessors have been attested and followed in this exegesis.
 Amongst the numerous opinions of exegesis only the authentic narration is accepted.
 Some verses are explained in such a manner that only scholars and God conscious men can take benefits from them.
 Some verses are not explored at length, but still they are sufficient to be comprehended.
 Some important matters are not mentioned in exegesis, but they can be felt with intensive comprehension of the text.
 The matters out of the content have been skipped accordingly.
 The verses explained by Marfu Ahadith of Prophet Muhammad have been preferred over any other tradition.
 The above mentioned necessity measures are not found in the beginning of the exegesis, but the author confronted them in the long run of exegesis.
 The Arabic marginalized exegesis is particularly for the men of understanding, and therefore need not such necessities to be followed.

Structure 
The work consists of three volumes. A detailed introduction, included at the beginning of the first volume, focuses on some of the basic issues of the Quran. Below is the list of volumes and their contents:

 The first volume — Al-Fatiha to Al-An'am
 The second volume — Al-A'raf to An-Nur
 The third volume — Al-Furqan to Al-Nas

Translations

Bangla
The first Bengali translation of this book was published in 1972 from Emdadia Library under the title 'Tafsire Ashrafi'.

English
An abridged English translation published from Zam-Zam Publishers in 2003 for those treading the path of suluk, discusses spiritual issues from the standpoint of tasawwuf. Its covered Al-Fatiha, Ad-Dhuha to Al-Nas.

Reception 
The monumental qualities of this Tafsir are reflected in Anwar Shah Kashmiri’s saying: "I first thought about this exegesis as been done for common man, but after going through it I recognized its importance for scholars as well." Bilal Ahmad Wani, a researcher of University of Kashmir wrote, "The exegesis is graced with wisdom in such a way that everyone can take benefit from it according to their mental capabilities. Besides providing a detailed explanation of fundamental principles of Islam, most importantly the mystical dimensions are deduced from the Quranic verses in order to purify the mysticism from un-Islamic thoughts like Wahdat al-Wajud (Unity of Being) and Nazriah-i Hulul (Transmigration) etc."

See also 

 List of tafsir works
 List of Sunni books

References

Further reading

External links 
 Bayan Ul Quran at Internet Archive

Books by Ashraf Ali Thanwi
1908 books
Sunni tafsir
Urdu-language books
Deobandi literature
Hanafi literature
Maturidi literature
Quran translations
Tafsir works
Sufi tafsir